Zaytoun ("Olive") is a 2012 Israeli adventure thriller film directed by Eran Riklis and produced by Gareth Unwin and Fred Ritzenberg. It premiered in September 2012 at the Toronto International Film Festival.

The screenplay was written by Nader Rizq, a Palestinian-American living in the United States. What started as a hobby in 1991 ended up making the semi-finals of the 2001 Nicholl Fellowships run by the Academy of Motion Picture Arts and Sciences. Subsequent re-writes again placed in the Nicholls and semi-finaled in the Ohio Independent Screenplay Awards. In late 2007, American producer Fred Ritzenberg came aboard and helped further develop the script.

Plot
During the 1982 Lebanon War, an Israeli fighter pilot, Yoni, is shot down over Beirut and captured by the Palestine Liberation Organization. Fahed, a precocious young Palestinian refugee who is angered by the death of his father in an Israeli air attack, agrees to help Yoni escape and lead him out of the city if Yoni will get him over the border and back to his family's ancestral village, where Fahed intends to plant an olive tree that his father had been tending in Beirut. As they embark on a hazardous road trip across the war-ravaged country, Yoni and Fahed move from suspicion and mutual antagonism to a tentative camaraderie as they make their way closer to the place they both call home.

Cast
 Stephen Dorff as Yoni
 Abdallah El Akal as Fahed
 Loai Noufi as Aboudi
 Ashraf Barhom
 Alice Taglioni as Leclair
 Ali Suliman as Syrian soldier
 Tarik Kopty as Seedo
 Mira Awad as Im Ahmed
 Ashraf Farah as Khaled
 Morad Hassan as Rami
 Doraid Liddawi as Syrian soldier
 Jony Arbid as Abu Fahed
 Nidal Badarneh as Mustafa
 Osamah Khoury as Hassan

Production
Most of the Beirut scenes were filmed in Haifa.

Controversy

The screenwriter Nader Rizq, has since come out speaking about changes made to his screenplay in violation of his integrity as an artist and spokesman for his people's rights. He mentions being excluded from the decision process which resulted in the last minute changes to the screenplay, yet he insisted on, and received sole writing credit.

He described a process where "Only Israeli concerns were addressed, Israeli opinions expressed, and Israeli versions of history permitted. Alternate perspectives were simply unacceptable. And no measure of carefully documented alarm made an iota of difference."

Examples of changes to Rizq's script include:

 Opening the film with a slide stating that the Israeli attack on Lebanon was a response to rocket attacks when a ceasefire had been in place for months.
 Removing Israeli cluster, phosphorus and air raids.
 Removal of a scene showing the effects of Israeli phosphorus and cluster bombing on the Palestinian refugee camps in Beirut (despite being in the script for years).
 Changing the killing of an Arab child by a phosphorus attack to being targeted by a Lebanese sniper instead.
 Limiting Israeli air raids attacks as initially described in the script.
 Decreasing the number of Israeli attacks while increasing Arabic violence.
 Depicting forced child soldiering among Palestinian youth.
 The original script planned to depict the Israeli pilot humanely reacting to the Arabic victims of Israeli bombing. This was never filmed and instead changed to him reacting to an Arabic woman killed senselessly by a group of Arabic militia.
 The final scene called for Fahed, on reaching his ancestral village and lands, to conclude: "Baba... I'm home". This was changed to "Baba... I'm here".

Critical reception
Zaytoun received mixed reviews, holding a 48% rating on review aggregator Rotten Tomatoes from 33 reviews, with an average rating of 5.5/10. The site's consensus states: "It has a lot on its mind, including a timely storyline with real-world significance; unfortunately, Zaytouns reach exceeds its grasp, partly due to the presence of a miscast Stephen Dorff." On Metacritic the film has a score of 39% based on 15 reviews, indicating "generally unfavorable reviews".

Variety published a good review, suggesting it was "an accessible, briskly paced and occasionally schematic adventure". So did The Huffington Post, whose review added it was "punctuated by some outstanding performances". However, The Financial Times suggested it was "simplistic" and there was "too much diplomacy".

References

External links
 
 
 

2012 films
2010s adventure films
2012 thriller drama films
Israeli thriller drama films
2010s Hebrew-language films
2010s Arabic-language films
2010s English-language films
Films directed by Eran Riklis
Films set in Lebanon
Films set in 1982
Films shot in Israel
Israeli independent films
2012 drama films
2012 multilingual films
Israeli multilingual films